Andrew Peter Fraser (born 15 September 1976) is Chancellor of Griffith University, and was formerly an Australian Labor politician. He was first elected into the Legislative Assembly of Queensland on 7 February 2004. He was the Deputy Premier of Queensland, Treasurer and Minister for State Development and Trade of the Queensland Government.
On 24 March 2012, Andrew Fraser lost his seat to the LNP candidate Saxon Rice.

Early life
Growing up in Proserpine, Queensland, Fraser moved to Brisbane after winning a scholarship to Griffith University. He undertook a Bachelor of Laws and Bachelor of Commerce at Griffith, obtaining first class honours and was winner of the University Medal. As a student, Fraser lived predominantly in the Brisbane suburb of Paddington; he then moved to Bardon where he now lives with his wife Therese, and son and daughter, Angus and Eleanor.

Political career
On 7 February 2004, Fraser was elected as the State Member for Mount Coot-tha and was subsequently re-elected in 2006. After the 2006 election, Fraser was appointed to the position of Local Government Minister, where he oversaw controversial council amalgamations in Queensland.

On 13 September 2007, Peter Beattie resigned as Premier of Queensland; that day, then Treasurer, Anna Bligh, was appointed as the new Premier, and Fraser was appointed Treasurer. At a subsequent media conference, Fraser stumbled by saying that he hoped to be a "future-focused Premier", but quickly corrected himself. Furthermore, on 26 March 2009, he was given an additional portfolio and appointed the Minister for Employment and Economic Development on top of already being State Treasurer.

On 21 February 2011, Premier Anna Bligh announced a machinery of government change and appointed Fraser as Treasurer and Minister for State Development and Trade.

Appointed at the age of 30, Fraser was the second-youngest Treasurer in the state's history. In 2011, Fraser became Deputy Premier of Queensland after the resignation of Paul Lucas from the position.

In the state election of 24 March 2012, Fraser lost his seat to the LNP candidate Saxon Rice.

References

1976 births
Living people
Members of the Queensland Legislative Assembly
Deputy Premiers of Queensland
Treasurers of Queensland
Griffith University alumni
Australian Labor Party members of the Parliament of Queensland
21st-century Australian politicians
20th-century Australian people